The 2002 Men's Asian Games Rugby union Tournament was held in Ulsan Public Stadium from October 5, 2002 to October 13, 2002.

South Korea won the gold medal in a round robin tournament.

Squads

Results
All times are Korea Standard Time (UTC+09:00)

Final standing

References
2002 Asian Games Report, Page 569

External links
 2002 Asian Games website

Men Union